Orthodera novaezealandiae, known as the New Zealand mantis or the New Zealand praying mantis, is a species of praying mantis which is, as both the scientific name and common names suggest, indigenous and endemic to New Zealand.

Description

O. novaezealandiae nymphs are pale, translucent green with a dark stripe running from head to end of abdomen. As adults, they are bright green and grow to between 35 mm and 40 mm in length.(see note ) As in most mantis species, sexual dimorphism means the female is larger.

The New Zealand mantis has a triangular head with slightly oversized compound eyes that give it excellent binocular vision (although they do have a blind spot). Its wings differ from those of other species in the "development of the archedictyon and the absence of cross-veins in the forewing".

"A very active little Mantis", O. novaezealandiae is well adapted as a predator. Its specialized forelimbs are long and equipped with extremely sharp spikes to trap prey. Blue eyespots on the underside of the insect's forelegs helps in differentiating this species from Miomantis caffra, an introduced species from South Africa that became established in New Zealand during the 1970s.

The ootheca of the New Zealand mantis has eggs arranged in two rows, quite different from the messier egg mass of Miomantis caffra. Oothecae are generally arranged facing north towards the sun, on the warm faces of branches and tree trunks.

Ecology

O. novaezealandiae prefer open, shrubby terrain where its similarity to leafy vegetation may be used as camouflage to ambush prey. It can reach high numbers in the branches of small manuka and kanuka trees in open meadow-like habitats where grass-dwelling prey such as small moths are abundant. It hides well from predators and is near or at the top of the invertebrate food chain in its habitat. As an endemic species of New Zealand that eats pests and has a very large appetite, O. novaezealandiae is a beneficial insect to those involved in agriculture and they are used in many gardens.

The New Zealand mantis is vulnerable to the use of pesticides, both directly and through the effects of a diminished food supply, and their ootheca are sometimes attacked by parasitic wasps. Male O.novaezealandiae appear to be attracted to females of the introduced species M. caffra, which can result in their fatality due to the sexually-cannibalistic behavior of the latter species.

The only two species of mantis in New Zealand are this native species and the previously mentioned introduced species M. caffra discovered as established in the Auckland suburb of New Lynn in 1978. O. novaezealandiae is taxonomically very close to, and has sometimes been considered conspecific and synonymous with, the Australian species O. ministralis.

Cultivation

The New Zealand mantis is bred in captivity. Special care must be taken to prevent this small, quick-moving species from escaping. Nymphs are especially fast and can leap relatively far as well. It can be kept at room temperature but does prefer warmth. Their enclosure should be sprayed with water a few times a week, and when they are young their enclosure should be kept at around 50%–60% humidity. Captive O. novaezealandiae can be fed on a diet of small crickets and flies. Nymphs can be reared easily on fruitflies such as Drosophila melanogaster.

See also
List of mantis genera and species

References

Bibliography
Ramsay, G.W., Fauna of New Zealand Number 19 Wellington, N.Z.: DSIR Publishing, 1990.
Patterson, Kathleen, J, "The Praying Mantis", Conservationist, June 193 v47 n6 p30(6).
Preston-Mafham, Ken, Grasshoppers and Mantids of the World London, UK.:Blandford 1990.

External links

Orthodera novaezealandiae bibliography from the New Zealand Entomological Society
 Orthodera novaezealandiae discussed on RNZ Critter of the Week, 27 May 2016
Article in T.E.R:R.A.I.N.: "Praying mantis (NZ)"
Picture in Te Ara: "Eating a spider"

Mantidae
Mantodea of New Zealand
Insects described in 1882